This is a list of people executed in the United States in 2000. Eighty-five people were executed in the United States in 2000. Forty of them were in the state of Texas; the most carried out within a single year in Texas state history. Two (Betty Lou Beets and Christina Marie Riggs) were female. Five (four in Alabama and one in Virginia) were executed via electrocution.

List of people executed in the United States in 2000

Demographics

Executions in recent years

See also
 List of death row inmates in the United States
 List of most recent executions by jurisdiction
 List of people scheduled to be executed in the United States
 List of women executed in the United States since 1976

References

List of people executed in the United States
executed
People executed in the United States
2000